Zinovy or Zalman Moiseyevich Vilensky (1899–1984) was a Soviet and Russian sculptor worked and lived in Moscow. Famous for his monumental portraits exhibited at landmarks of Russia such as Moscow, Tretyakov Gallery and many others. He was awarded Stalin Prize in 1948, Became a corresponding member of USSR Academy of Arts and a People's Painter of the USSR in 1980.

Biography 

Zinovy was born on 15(3) October 1899 in Koriukivka, Chernigov Governorate. He finished the school at the Sugar Factory in Chernigovshina and then in 1914 entered Kiev Art College were studied till 1919 and before he had graduated moved back to his motherland, village Korukovka. He worked as a decorator in the theatre of Sugar Factory and also worked as a teacher of drawing in technical secondary school of Korukovka. Then he moved to Petrograd (now Saint Petersburg) and studied in Municipal free art workshops (Academy of Arts) preparing to enter Vkhutemas. There were no places in the School Fine Art where he wanted to enter so he entered the School of Sculpture and studied there in 1922–1928. Among his teachers were Joseph Chaikov, Ivan Efimov and Anton Lavinsky.

In 1930s he started participating in biggest art exhibitions while working on Portrait Busts and Monuments. He took part in the Exhibition organised in favour of 15 years anniversary of the Red Army in 1933 with two works in plaster: "Recon" and "Patrol". His first famous works were: monument of Vladimir Lenin in Azov, Portrait of Mikhail Kalinin and Bust of Sergei Kirov in Manufacturing plant "Dinamo"; Portraits of such well-known musicians as Konstantin Igumnov (1939) and Alexander Goldenweiser (1940).

During World War II Vilensky was working in metallurgical plant where he created his famous "Ural Series" of terracotta sculptures (1941-1943).

Personal exhibitions:
1943, 1944 Perm
1955, 1967, 1975 and 1980 Moscow

After the war he lived in Moscow where he died on 15 October 1984.

Notable Works

Sculptures 
Konstantin Igumnov (1939) - Plaster - Tretyakov Gallery 
Pyotr Ilyich Tchaikovsky (1949) - Marble - Tretyakov Gallery 
Semen Alekseevich Lavochkin (1947) - Marble - Tretyakov Gallery 
Stepan Elizarovich Artemenko (1948) - Bronze - Rasulovo, Odessa region 
Ivan Harlamovich Mihaylichenko (1948-1949) - Bronze - Almazniy, Lugank region 
Sergey Alekseevich Chaplygin (1950) - Plaster - NMM Zhukovsky 
Bertrand Russell (1966) - Bronze 
Mikhail Gromov (1970) - Bronze 
Sergei Korolev (1981) - Marble

Monuments 
Sergei Kirov - Borovichi 
Vladimir Lenin (1957) - Bronze - Sochi, Russia
A P Vinogradov (1977) - Marble - Alley of Heroes, St.Peterburg 
Sergei Korolev (1980) - Marble - Korolev, Russia 
G P Svishev (1982) - Marble - Alley of Heroes, St.Peterburg

Awards
Stalin Prize 1948, 
Corresponding member of the USSR Academy of Arts 1966, 
People's Painter of the RSFSR 1969, 
People's Painter of the USSR 1980

References

External links and Publications
 Listed in Best 10,000 World artists by Russian Artists Trade Union
 Exhibition Catalogue: Vystavka Proizvedeniy Zinoviya Moiseevicha Vilenskogo ("Zinovy Moiseyevich Vilensky"). Academy of Arts and Union of Artists, Moscow 1966
 Book about Z. Vilensky: A.V.Paramonov, Moscow 1971
 Book about Z. Vilensky: Izobr. Iskusstvo, Moscow 1985

1899 births
1984 deaths
20th-century Russian artists
20th-century Russian painters
20th-century Russian sculptors
People from Chernihiv Oblast
People from Chernigov Governorate
Full Members of the USSR Academy of Arts
Vkhutemas alumni
People's Artists of the USSR (visual arts)
Stalin Prize winners
Recipients of the Order of the Red Banner of Labour
Russian male painters
Russian male sculptors
Russian portrait painters
Soviet painters
Soviet sculptors
Ukrainian Jews
Burials at Novodevichy Cemetery